The Western Collegiate Hockey Association (WCHA) is the oldest active NCAA Division I ice hockey-only conference beginning in 1959–60, and based in Denver, Colorado. At the conclusion of each regular season, it holds the WCHA Men's Ice Hockey Tournament to determine its conference champion(s), which it has done since the foundation of the conference.

The tournament has had many variations over the course of its history, starting with four teams and naming two regional champions. The modern format of the tournament, where only one champion was crowned, wasn't codified until 1981–82 after four teams left to join the CCHA and the NCAA began to offer automatic bids to the National tournament rather than inviting finals participants.

Denver has won the most WCHA championships with 15. Murray Armstrong has won the most titles (10), all with Denver, and appeared in the second most title games. John MacInnes has appeared in the most title games (15) and won the second most, all with Michigan Tech. These numbers are, however, misleading as the WCHA had named two tournament champions for most of its first 22 years rather than offering a game(s) to decide a single champion, the era that both Armstrong and MacInnes coached in. Had this policy continued unabated Doug Woog would be tied with Armstrong for most titles as well as winning 5 consecutive (1990–1994) and appearing in 12 consecutive finals (1986–1997).

Champions

† East regional champion‡ West regional champion* Champion decided by a total goal sum in multiple games

References

External links
The Official Site of the WCHA

 
College ice hockey in the United States lists